Ulterior Motive is a 2015 Chinese action thriller film directed by cinematographer Arthur Wong and starring Gordon Lam, Qin Lan, Simon Yam, Archie Kao and Liu Wei. The film is Wong's first directorial effort since 1988's In the Line of Duty 3.

Plot
Originally living a happy and stable life, things have become clouded for rich heiress Ye Shuang (Qin Lan) after the unexpected disappearance of her husband Ling Feng (Archie Kao) and daughter. After consulting with her father Ye Cheng (Simon Yam), Shuang decides to call the police, where she re-encounters her ex-boyfriend, Yao Jie (Gordon Lam).

During the investigation process, Jie finds this million-dollar ransom kidnapping case to be a misty mystery. Specializing in investigating by starting from minor details, he targets Cheng as a potential suspect. At this time, Cheng's activities has also become suspiciously strange. When the mystery seemed to have dispersed, Cheng dies from an accident. At this time, clues from a murder case that took place 20 years ago begins to surface. Behind the mysterious kidnappings lies the ulterior motive.

Cast
Gordon Lam as Yao Jie
Qin Lan as Ye Shuang
Simon Yam as Ye Cheng
Archie Kao as Ling Feng
Liu Wei as Xiao Xin
Steven Miao
Gao Xin as Xiao Qiang
Qu Qingqing
Ren Shan

References

External links

Ulterior Motive at Douban

Chinese action thriller films
2015 action thriller films
2010s mystery films
Police detective films
2010s Mandarin-language films
Films about kidnapping
Films set in China
Films shot in China
2015 films
Huayi Brothers films